One in eight Canadian households lived in a residential condominium dwellings, mostly located in a few census metropolitan areas according to Statistics Canada Condominiums exist throughout Canada, although condominiums are most frequently found in the larger cities.

With regular condominiums, the unit owner usually owns the internal unit space and a percentage of the common property; in the case of a freehold condominium (or a bare/vacant land condominium) the owner owns the land and building and a percentage of any common property shared roadways and amenities. The Canadian Condominium Institute is a non-profit association of condominium owners and corporations with chapters in each province and territory. The Condo Owners Association COA Ontario is a non-profit association representing condominium owners with divisions across the province and districts within the various municipalities.

History 
Before 1981 condominiums made up less than ten percent of homes built in Canada.

British Columbia Strata Housing

Over a million people live in strata housing in British Columbia. Strata properties are a popular housing choice in B.C. because it is  convenient, provides security and added amenities and is  usually less costly than buying a single-family home.

As the price of single-family housing has soared to unprecedented levels in Vancouver, the number of new condominium sales has increased, along with prices. According to the Real Estate Board of Greater Vancouver, the benchmark price for a condo in July 2016 was $510,600 in the region, up 27.4 per cent from the same month in 2015.

Insurance under the Strata Property Act
The Act requires all stratas to maintain an insurance policy for a minimum of $2 million (property and liability) that covers the common elements and the units as originally buïlt.

Ontario 

There are over 1.3 million condo owners and/or residents living in more than 587,000 condominium units in Ontario. One-half of new construction in 2013 was condominium-related. In recent years, the condominium industry has been booming in Canada, with dozens of new towers being erected each year. Toronto is the centre of this boom, with 17,000 new units being sold in 2005, more than double second place Miami's 7,500 units. Toronto's condo population has grown from 978,125 in 2011 to 1.478 million people in 2016 representing 54.7% of the city population according to Toronto Condo News.

Outside of Toronto, the most common forms of condominium have been townhomes rather than highrises, although that trend may be altered as limitations are placed on "Greenfields" (see Greenfield land) developments in those areas (in turn, forcing developers to expand upward rather than outward and to consider more condominium conversions instead of new housing). Particular growth areas are in Kitchener/Waterloo, Barrie, and London. In fact, after Toronto, the Golden Horseshoe Chapter of the Canadian Condominium Institute is one of that organization's most thriving chapters.

Ontario Condominium Act

Condominium Authority of Ontario
Condominium Authority of Ontario (CAO) was established in 2017 by the Province of Ontario to address concerns about condo living and management in the province.  Its goal is to minimize issues before they become disputes to help with community building.  To do this they have implemented three pillars; education, mandated reporting and disclosure of information, and a tribunal for handling disputes that arise  In a March 2018 Toronto Condo News article, the Executive Director of the Condominium Authority of Ontario explains it has an "overarching goal to enhance consumer protection for condominium owners, directors and residents. This is made possible through a comprehensive offering of information about condominium ownership including self-help tools, mandatory director training, and a new online dispute resolution service, the Condominium Authority Tribunal (CAT)."

Ontario Condominium Act, 1998
Until December 2015, condominiums in Ontario were governed by the Ontario Condominium Act, 1998 with each development establishing a corporation to deal with day-to-day functions (maintenance, repairs, etc.). A board of directors is elected by the owners of units (or, in the case of a common elements condominium corporation, the owners of the common interest in the common elements) in the development on at least a yearly basis. A general meeting is held annually to deal with board elections and the appointment of an auditor (or waiving of audit). Other matters can also be dealt with at the Annual General Meeting, but special meetings of the owners can be called by the board and, in some cases, by the owners themselves, at any time.

The Ontario Condominium Act, 1998 provided an effectively wide range of development options, including Standard, Phased, Vacant Land, Common Element and Leasehold condominiums. Certain existing condominiums can amalgamate, and existing properties can be converted to condominium (provided municipal requirements for the same are met). Accordingly, the expanded and expanding use of the condominium concept is permitting developers and municipalities to consider newer and more interesting forms of development to meet social needs.

On this issue, Ontario condominium lawyer Michael Clifton writes, "Condominium development has steadily increased in Ontario for several years. While condominiums typically represent an attractive lifestyle and home-ownership alternatives for buyers, they also, importantly, introduce a new approach to community planning for home builders and municipal approval authorities in Ontario. ...[There are] opportunities for developers to be both creative and profitable in building, and municipalities more flexible and imaginative in planning and approving, developments that will become sustainable communities."

Reserve fund contributions are ten per cent of the condominium fees collected or higher.  Contrary to other jurisdictions such as Alberta, Ontario does not provide flexibility for small condo corporations to conduct their own reserve fund study, or to update it less frequently than required for large corporations.  Managers of small condominium corporations have asked the Ontario Ministry of Consumer Services to review this requirement as it becomes burdensome for the management of smaller buildings.

Condo Owners Association
The Condo Owners Association (COA) in Ontario was established in March 2010 by Founder Linda Pinizzotto in March 2010, a Toronto/Mississauga Realtor who had a vision to create a non profit Association to provide a cohesive united voice to represent condominium owners across the Province of Ontario to all levels of Government and to advocate for a Condo Act Review to update and modernize the Condo Act in Ontario.   Bill 38, Condominium Act 1998 is a Provincial Legislation which applies to and regulates all Condo Corporations.  Each province has its own Act because housing is a provincial jurisdiction.   The Condo Owners Association (COA) Ontario presented substantial recommendations to the Ministry of Government and Consumer Services to implement better consumer protection, condo board governance, finance and reserve fund management, licensing of Condominium Managers and a dispute resolution process through a Condo Act Review.   The COA was concerned that one million people living in approx 525,000 condominium units, the present Act 1998 lacked proper representation and was out of date.  By 2011, the COA voice was heard, Toronto was North America's fastest growing high-rise condo market and on June 08, 2012 "Building a Better Condominium Act" was announce by the McGuinty Government to Launch a Condo Review Consultation.  The Condo Owners Association holds a position on various stakeholder groups and provides representation and information for condo owners, buyers, and the general public. The COA was engaged in the Condominium Act review that culminated in the 2015 changes to the Condominium Act, Protecting Condo Owners Act 2015 and the Condominium Management Services Act, 2015 provides licensing of condo managers and management providers in Ontario came into full force February 1, 2018.   

The Association of Condominium Managers of Ontario is the  association of Professional Condominium Managers across Ontario.

Protecting Condominium Owners Act, 2015
On May 27, 2015, David Orazietti, Ontario's  Minister of Government and Consumer Services,  introduced a new bill called the Protecting Condominium Owners Act, 2015. The bill called for the creation of a new Condominium Authority, which would be funded   by a $1 a month fee on individual condo owners and by condo developers, that would provide advice for condo owners, facilitate dispute resolution between owners and boards regarding issues such as noise complaints, bylaw infractions or an inability to get financial statements from the board of directors. Critics of the bill said that the bill would result in increased fees and more special assessments. The aim of the Act is to make it less expensive to resolve disputes. The Act will require boards to issue reports to owners on things such as insurance or  legal proceedings. Clear language will  spell out the amount of an adequate Reserve fund study and  help eliminate surprise hikes in condo fees or special assessments levied against each unit. On December 2, 2015  Third Reading of this Act was Carried on division and on  December 3, 2015   Royal Assent was received,

Condo Manager Licensing Authority 
The Act introduces a new body, the Condo Manager Licensing Authority. There will be training and licensing of condominium management companies and individuals to ensure those hired to run multimillion-dollar condominium corporations are adequately trained to reduce the risk of fraud and mismanagement. The Act also introduces a code of ethics for condo managers. There were 2,500 people managing  10,000 condominium developments in Ontario, with  700,000 individual units.

Saskatchewan 
In Saskatchewan, condominiums are registered as a special type of non-profit corporation that is owned by the unit owners; the owners elect a board of directors; the operation of the corporation is governed by The Condominium Property Act, 1993.

Criticism and controversy
According to  Maclean's:
Canadian condos are rife with internal politics, neighbour infighting and power struggles stemming from the complicated network of condo boards, owners, investors, tenants and property managers

See also

Categories
:Category:Condominiums in Canada
:Category:Condominium

References

External links
 (Alberta) Condomium Property Act
(Alberta) Condominium Property Amendment Act
 (British Columbia) Strata Property Act
(British Columbia) regulations
(Nunavut) CONDOMINIUM ACT
(Ontario) Condominium Act, 1998
 (Ontario) Bill 106, Protecting Condominium Owners Act, 2015
(Ontario) Condominium Management Services Act, 2015, S.O. 2015, c. 28, Sched. 2 
 (Saskatchewan) Condominium Property Act, 1993
(Yukon) CONDOMINIUM ACT

 
Real property law
Canada